The Cancionero de Turin or Cancionero Musical de Turin is a musical manuscript that contains Spanish secular polyphonic works from the period between the end of the 16th century and the beginning of the 17th century, in the transition period between the Renaissance and the Baroque eras.

The manuscript 
The manuscript is kept at the National University Library (R.1–14) in Turin, Italy.

The index section lists 47 works, but one of them is duplicated. Th manuscript includes three other works that are not listed in the index, two of which are also duplicated. On the other hand, the works listed as numbers 36 and 37, Salte y baile and Mi voluntad no me dexa are in fact parts of a single work titled Por dinero baila el perro. Therefore, the cancionero contains 46 individual works. One of them is for 4 voices, 35 are for 3 voices and the ten remaining are for 2 voices. The musical forms employed are the villancico, the canción and the romance.

All the pieces are anonymous, but one of them, Sobre moradas violetas, is also found in the Cancionero de la Sablonara, attributed to the Sevillian guitarist and composer Juan de Palomares, on a text by Catalina Zamudio.

Several texts were extracted from the romancero or were written by known authors, such as Lope de Vega, Catalina Zamudio, etc.

List of works

Concordance with other manuscripts:
SAB - Múnich, Bayerische Staatsbibliothek, Mus. Ms. E.200 (Cancionero de la Sablonara).

Discography 
 1982/1990 - [PMA] Música en la obra de Cervantes. Pro Música Antiqua de Madrid. Miguel Ángel Tallante. MEC 1028 CD
 2002 - [CLA] Canciones de amor y de guerra. Clarincanto. Pneuma
 2005 - [FIC] Cancionero de Turín. Musica Ficta. Raúl Mallavibarrena. Enchiriadis EN 2013.

References and bibliography 
 
 
 Raúl Mallavibarrena's article inside the booklet of the album Cancionero de Turín by Musica Ficta.

External links 
 List of works

16th-century manuscripts
17th-century manuscripts
16th century in Spain
Music publications
Spanish manuscripts
17th century in Spain
Music history